The 1891 Colgate football team represented Colgate University in the 1891 college football season.

Schedule

References

Colgate
Colgate Raiders football seasons
Colgate football